The Deputy Prime Minister of Suriname was a title given to a member of the Cabinet of Ministers of Suriname between 1954 and 1988, often to recognize members of other parties in the ruling coalition. The deputy prime minister served as acting prime minister in the absence of the Prime Minister of Suriname.

This position was abolished when the current Constitution of Suriname went into effect in 1988; however, its functions were continued in the extra-constitutional position of Deputy Vice President from 1988 to 1990.

List of officeholders

Deputy prime ministers of Suriname (1954–1988)

Deputy Vice President of Suriname (1988–1990)

Timeline

See also
 Politics of Suriname
 List of prime ministers of Suriname
 List of colonial governors of Suriname
 President of Suriname
 First Lady of Suriname
 Vice President of Suriname

Notes

References

Deputy prime ministers
Government ministers of Suriname
Lists of deputy prime ministers